Krishna Nee Late Aagi Baaro is a 2010 Indian Kannada language comedy film directed by actor Mohan Shankar. Besides Mohan, the film stars Ramesh Aravind, Neethu and Nidhi Subbaiah in pivotal roles.  The film is produced by S.CHANDRA SHEKAR and the music is composed by the flautist Pravin Godkhindi.

The film released on 9 April 2010 across Karnataka cinema halls. The critics noted the film to be funny and the lead characters performance to be noteworthy, henceforth the movie garnered positive reviews making it a commercially successful movie.

Plot
Krishna (Ramesh) is a lecturer in a women's college. Lakshmi (Nidhi), his relative, is in deep love with him. However, he hates all women as taught by his Guru. Meanwhile, Sumitra Andal (Neethu) is a student of Krishna and is in love with a fashion photographer Sundaram Pillai (Mohan). But her father is against this as he is adamant to have his daughter married to his own caste. To get into the wedlock, Sumitra lies to her father that Sundaram belong to their own caste and fools everyone around her. Her father wants Krishna to be his son-in-law. How the subsequent event turn the lives of these four main characters forms the rest of the story.

Cast 
 Ramesh Aravind as Krishna
 Mohan Shankar as Sundaram Pillai
 Neethu as Sumithra Andal
 Nidhi Subbaiah as Lakshmi
 H. G. Dattatreya
 Doddanna
 Sundar Raj
 Veena Sundar
 Tennis Krishna
 Bank Janardhan
 M. S. Umesh
 Dingri Nagaraj

Soundtrack 
All the songs are composed and scored by popular flautist Pravin Godkhindi. The track list consists of 7 songs most of which is penned by actor-director Mohan Shankar.

Reception

Critical response 

Shruti Indira Lakshminarayana of Rediff.com scored the film at 2.5 out of 5 stars and says "Dialogues, also by Mohan, make you laugh only at places. Given his calibre, he could have surely come up with wittier dialogues and situations. Also, a repeat of a few scenes involving Krishna and his students could have been done away with". A critic from Deccan Herald wrote "Mohan is guilty of giving the tall, athletic Neethu costumes that are way beyond tacky. He is also guilty of draping gorgeous Nidhi from head to foot. But most important, those looking for a full-blown story will be disappointed". A critic from The Times of India scored the film at 3 out of 5 stars and wrote "Hats off to Ramesh for his brilliant performance. Mohan is as good as his direction. Neethu and Nidhi Subbaiah are excellent, as is Sundararaj. Dattanna is gracious, while Pravin Godkhindi''s music is impressive".

References 

2010 films
2010s Kannada-language films
Indian comedy films
2010 comedy films
2010 directorial debut films